Arthur Jimmerson (born August 4, 1963) is an American retired boxer & mixed martial artist who competed at super middleweight, light heavyweight, and cruiserweight. As an amateur, Jimmerson was the 1983 National Golden Gloves Middleweight champion. He finished his boxing career in 2002, with a record of 33–18.

Biography

Ultimate Fighting Championship
In November 1993, Jimmerson competed at the very first Ultimate Fighting Championship competition, UFC 1. He came to his first match wearing only one boxing glove in order to protect his jab hand and leave free the other, which earned him the nickname of Art "One Glove" Jimmerson in the process. His opponent would be Brazilian jiu-jitsu master and eventual tournament winner Royce Gracie.

Gracie opened the fight keeping distance with Jimmerson via front kicks. He then shot a double leg takedown and achieved mount over the boxer, grapevining his legs and tying up his arms. After Gracie landed the first headbutt, Jimmerson, who had been unsuccessfully trying to get out of the hold, tapped out. It was Jimmerson's first and last MMA match, as he returned to boxing shortly after.

Later career
Jimmerson is now the head boxing coach at the UFC GYM in Torrance, CA.

Jimmerson expressed an interest in fighting former YouTube sensation and UFC fighter Kimbo Slice in a boxing match.

Professional boxing record

|-
|align="center" colspan=8|33 Wins (17 knockouts, 16 decisions), 18 Losses (12 knockouts, 6 decisions)
|-
| align="center" style="border-style: none none solid solid; background: #e3e3e3"|Result
| align="center" style="border-style: none none solid solid; background: #e3e3e3"|Record
| align="center" style="border-style: none none solid solid; background: #e3e3e3"|Opponent
| align="center" style="border-style: none none solid solid; background: #e3e3e3"|Type
| align="center" style="border-style: none none solid solid; background: #e3e3e3"|Round
| align="center" style="border-style: none none solid solid; background: #e3e3e3"|Date
| align="center" style="border-style: none none solid solid; background: #e3e3e3"|Location
| align="center" style="border-style: none none solid solid; background: #e3e3e3"|Notes
|-
|Loss
|
|align=left| Rydell Booker
|TKO
|2
|23/11/2002
|align=left| Danville, Virginia, U.S.
|align=left|
|-
|Loss
|
|align=left| Mike Rodgers
|TKO
|3
|12/10/2002
|align=left| Nashville, Tennessee, U.S.
|align=left|
|-
|Loss
|
|align=left| Rich LaMontagne
|TKO
|1
|28/06/2002
|align=left| Boston, Massachusetts, U.S.
|align=left|
|-
|Loss
|
|align=left| Mike Rodgers
|DQ
|3
|11/08/2001
|align=left| Little Rock, Arkansas, U.S.
|align=left|
|-
|Loss
|
|align=left| Arthur Williams
|KO
|1
|09/01/1999
|align=left| Pensacola, Florida, U.S.
|align=left|
|-
|Loss
|
|align=left| Adolpho Washington
|TKO
|3
|27/11/1998
|align=left| Gary, Indiana, U.S.
|align=left|
|-
|Loss
|
|align=left| Dale Brown
|KO
|3
|03/04/1998
|align=left| Montreal, Quebec, Canada
|align=left|
|-
|Loss
|
|align=left| Vassiliy Jirov
|TKO
|2
|06/12/1997
|align=left| Atlantic City, New Jersey, U.S.
|align=left|
|-
|Loss
|
|align=left| Terry Dunstan
|TKO
|1
|12/04/1997
|align=left| Sheffield, England
|align=left|
|-
|Win
|
|align=left| Earl Abernathy
|UD
|6
|23/09/1996
|align=left| St. Louis, Missouri, U.S.
|align=left|
|-
|Loss
|
|align=left| Torsten May
|KO
|5
|09/09/1995
|align=left| Bielefeld, Germany
|align=left|
|-
|Loss
|
|align=left| Brian LaSpada
|DQ
|11
|17/06/1995
|align=left| Las Vegas, Nevada, U.S.
|align=left|
|-
|Win
|
|align=left| Jerry Halstead
|SD
|8
|01/05/1995
|align=left| St. Louis, Missouri, U.S.
|align=left|
|-
|Loss
|
|align=left| Holsey Ellingburg
|PTS
|8
|29/10/1994
|align=left| St. Louis, Missouri, U.S.
|align=left|
|-
|Win
|
|align=left| Anthony Peat
|KO
|3
|10/10/1994
|align=left| St. Louis, Missouri, U.S.
|align=left|
|-
|Win
|
|align=left| Lopez McGee
|PTS
|6
|01/04/1994
|align=left| St. Louis, Missouri, U.S.
|align=left|
|-
|Loss
|
|align=left| Orlin Norris
|TKO
|4
|09/01/1994
|align=left| Del Mar, California, U.S.
|align=left|
|-
|Win
|
|align=left| Rick Myers
|TKO
|4
|27/09/1993
|align=left| St. Louis, Missouri, U.S.
|align=left|
|-
|Win
|
|align=left| Tim Fitzgerald
|TKO
|1
|06/05/1993
|align=left| St. Louis, Missouri, U.S.
|align=left|
|-
|Win
|
|align=left| Mike Smith
|KO
|2
|15/03/1993
|align=left| Jefferson City, Missouri, U.S.
|align=left|
|-
|Win
|
|align=left| Lopez McGee
|TKO
|3
|08/03/1993
|align=left| St. Louis, Missouri, U.S.
|align=left|
|-
|Win
|
|align=left| Larry Prather
|UD
|10
|11/01/1993
|align=left| St. Louis, Missouri, U.S.
|align=left|
|-
|Win
|
|align=left| Tim Johnson
|PTS
|10
|30/11/1992
|align=left| St. Louis, Missouri, U.S.
|align=left|
|-
|Win
|
|align=left| John Collier
|PTS
|6
|29/08/1992
|align=left| St. Louis, Missouri, U.S.
|align=left|
|-
|Win
|
|align=left| Lopez McGee
|UD
|8
|17/08/1992
|align=left| St. Louis, Missouri, U.S.
|align=left|
|-
|Win
|
|align=left| Sylvester White
|PTS
|8
|22/06/1992
|align=left| Bridgeton, Missouri, U.S.
|align=left|
|-
|Win
|
|align=left| Tim Knight
|TKO
|6
|13/04/1992
|align=left| St. Louis, Missouri, U.S.
|align=left|
|-
|Win
|
|align=left| Phil Brown
|KO
|3
|27/03/1992
|align=left| St. Louis, Missouri, U.S.
|align=left|
|-
|Win
|
|align=left| Jordan Keepers
|TKO
|1
|20/03/1992
|align=left| St. Louis, Missouri, U.S.
|align=left|
|-
|Win
|
|align=left| Tim Knight
|DQ
|7
|17/02/1992
|align=left| St. Louis, Missouri, U.S.
|align=left|
|-
|Win
|
|align=left| William Dorsett
|TKO
|1
|06/01/1992
|align=left| St. Louis, Missouri, U.S.
|align=left|
|-
|Win
|
|align=left| Paul McPeek
|TKO
|9
|03/05/1991
|align=left| St. Louis, Missouri, U.S.
|align=left|
|-
|Loss
|
|align=left| Andrew Maynard
|RTD
|3
|29/04/1990
|align=left| Atlantic City, New Jersey, U.S.
|align=left|
|-
|Win
|
|align=left| Randy Smith
|UD
|10
|09/03/1990
|align=left| St. Louis, Missouri, U.S.
|align=left|
|-
|Win
|
|align=left| William Knorr
|TKO
|1
|16/02/1990
|align=left| St. Louis, Missouri, U.S.
|align=left|
|-
|Loss
|
|align=left| Dennis Andries
|UD
|10
|26/10/1989
|align=left| Atlantic City, New Jersey, U.S.
|align=left|
|-
|Loss
|
|align=left| Jeff Harding
|UD
|10
|01/03/1989
|align=left| Newcastle, Australia
|align=left|
|-
|Win
|
|align=left| Bill Lee
|UD
|10
|29/10/1988
|align=left| St. Louis, Missouri, U.S.
|align=left|
|-
|Win
|
|align=left| Jerry Okorodudu
|UD
|10
|27/09/1988
|align=left| St. Louis, Missouri, U.S.
|align=left|
|-
|Win
|
|align=left| Lenny LaPaglia
|TKO
|6
|14/07/1988
|align=left| New York City, New York, U.S.
|align=left|
|-
|Win
|
|align=left| Lopez McGee
|PTS
|10
|09/06/1988
|align=left| St. Louis, Missouri, U.S.
|align=left|
|-
|Win
|
|align=left| Danny Thomas
|PTS
|6
|19/05/1988
|align=left| Saginaw, Michigan, U.S.
|align=left|
|-
|Win
|
|align=left| Assim Rezzaq
|KO
|3
|05/03/1988
|align=left| St. Louis, Missouri, U.S.
|align=left|
|-
|Win
|
|align=left| John Moore
|SD
|6
|23/01/1988
|align=left| St. Louis, Missouri, U.S.
|align=left|
|-
|Loss
|
|align=left| Manuel Murillo
|TKO
|7
|19/06/1986
|align=left| San Diego, California, U.S.
|align=left|
|-
|Loss
|
|align=left| David Johnson
|MD
|6
|10/02/1986
|align=left| Inglewood, California, U.S.
|align=left|
|-
|Win
|
|align=left| Danny Blake
|PTS
|8
|02/11/1985
|align=left| San Francisco, California, U.S.
|align=left|
|-
|Win
|
|align=left| John Murphy
|TKO
|2
|27/09/1985
|align=left| Phoenix, Arizona, U.S.
|align=left|
|-
|Win
|
|align=left| Robert Williams
|TKO
|2
|18/07/1985
|align=left| San Diego, California, U.S.
|align=left|
|-
|Win
|
|align=left| Manuel Leyva
|KO
|1
|27/06/1985
|align=left| San Diego, California, U.S.
|align=left|
|-
|Win
|
|align=left| Sal Trujillo
|KO
|1
|25/04/1985
|align=left| San Diego, California, U.S.
|align=left|
|}

Mixed martial arts record 

|-
| Loss
| align=center| 0-1
| Royce Gracie
| Submission (mount)
| UFC 1
| 
| align=center| 1
| align=center| 2:18
| Denver, Colorado, United States
|

See also
List of mixed martial artists with professional boxing records

References

External links
 
 
 
 
 
 Art Jimmerson: Where is he now

1963 births
Living people
Boxers from Los Angeles
Art Jimmerson
Mixed martial artists utilizing boxing
American male boxers
Ultimate Fighting Championship male fighters